Coping refers to conscious strategies used to reduce unpleasant emotions. Coping strategies can be cognitions or behaviours and can be individual or social.

Theories of coping
Hundreds of coping strategies have been proposed in an attempt to understand how people cope. Classification of these strategies into a broader architecture has not been agreed upon. Researchers try to group coping responses rationally, empirically by factor analysis, or through a blend of both techniques. In the early days, Folkman and Lazarus split the coping strategies into four groups, namely problem-focused, emotion-focused, support-seeking, and meaning-making coping. Weiten has identified four types of coping strategies: appraisal-focused (adaptive cognitive), problem-focused (adaptive behavioral), emotion-focused, and occupation-focused coping. Billings and Moos added avoidance coping as one of the emotion-focused coping. Some scholars have questioned the psychometric validity of forced categorisation as those strategies are not independent to each other. Besides, in reality, people can adopt multiple coping strategies simultaneously.

Typically, people use a mixture of several types of coping strategies, which may change over time. All these strategies can prove useful, but some claim that those using problem-focused coping strategies will adjust better to life. Problem-focused coping mechanisms may allow an individual greater perceived control over their problem, whereas emotion-focused coping may sometimes lead to a reduction in perceived control (maladaptive coping).

Lazarus "notes the connection between his idea of 'defensive reappraisals' or cognitive coping and Freud's concept of 'ego-defenses, coping strategies thus overlapping with a person's defense mechanisms.

Appraisal-focused coping strategies
Appraisal-focused (adaptive cognitive) strategies occur when the person modifies the way they think, for example: employing denial, or distancing oneself from the problem. Individuals who use appraisal coping strategies purposely alter their perspective on their situation in order to have a more positive outlook on their situation. An example of appraisal coping strategies could be an individual purchasing tickets to a football game, knowing their medical condition would likely cause them to not be able to attend. People may alter the way they think about a problem by altering their goals and values, such as by seeing the humor in a situation: "some have suggested that humor may play a greater role as a stress moderator among women than men".

Adaptive behavioural coping strategies
The psychological coping mechanisms are commonly termed coping strategies or coping skills. The term coping generally refers to adaptive (constructive) coping strategies, that is, strategies which reduce stress. In contrast, other coping strategies may be coined as maladaptive, if they increase stress. Maladaptive coping is therefore also described, based on its outcome, as non-coping. Furthermore, the term coping generally refers to reactive coping, i.e. the coping response which follows the stressor. This differs from proactive coping, in which a coping response aims to neutralize a future stressor. Subconscious or unconscious strategies (e.g. defense mechanisms) are generally excluded from the area of coping.

The effectiveness of the coping effort depends on the type of stress, the individual, and the circumstances. Coping responses are partly controlled by personality (habitual traits), but also partly by the social environment, particularly the nature of the stressful environment.
People using problem-focused strategies try to deal with the cause of their problem. They do this by finding out information on the problem and learning new skills to manage the problem. Problem-focused coping is aimed at changing or eliminating the source of the stress. The three problem-focused coping strategies identified by Folkman and Lazarus are: taking control, information seeking, and evaluating the pros and cons. However, problem-focused coping may not be necessarily adaptive, but backfire, especially in the uncontrollable case that one cannot make the problem go away.

Emotion-focused coping strategies
Emotion-focused strategies involve:
 releasing pent-up emotions
 distracting oneself
 managing hostile feelings
 meditating
 mindfulness practices
 using systematic relaxation procedures.
Emotion-focused coping "is oriented toward managing the emotions that accompany the perception of stress". The five emotion-focused coping strategies identified by Folkman and Lazarus are:
 disclaiming
 escape-avoidance
 accepting responsibility or blame
 exercising self-control
 and positive reappraisal.
Emotion-focused coping is a mechanism to alleviate distress by minimizing, reducing, or preventing, the emotional components of a stressor. This mechanism can be applied through a variety of ways, such as:
 seeking social support
 reappraising the stressor in a positive light
 accepting responsibility
 using avoidance
 exercising self-control
 distancing 
The focus of this coping mechanism is to change the meaning of the stressor or transfer attention away from it. For example, reappraising tries to find a more positive meaning of the cause of the stress in order to reduce the emotional component of the stressor. Avoidance of the emotional distress will distract from the negative feelings associated with the stressor. Emotion-focused coping is well suited for stressors that seem uncontrollable (ex. a terminal illness diagnosis, or the loss of a loved one). Some mechanisms of emotion focused coping, such as distancing or avoidance, can have alleviating outcomes for a short period of time, however they can be detrimental when used over an extended period. Positive emotion-focused mechanisms, such as seeking social support, and positive re-appraisal, are associated with beneficial outcomes. Emotional approach coping is one form of emotion-focused coping in which emotional expression and processing is used to adaptively manage a response to a stressor. Other examples include relaxation training through deep breathing, meditation, yoga, music and art therapy, and aromatherapy, as well as grounding, which uses physical sensations or mental distractions to refocus from the stressor to present.

Health theory of coping
The health theory of coping overcame the limitations of previous theories of coping, describing coping strategies within categories that are conceptually clear, mutually exclusive, comprehensive, functionally homogenous, functionally distinct, generative and flexible, explains the continuum of coping strategies. The usefulness of all coping strategies to reduce acute distress is acknowledged, however, strategies are categorised as healthy or unhealthy depending on their likelihood of additional adverse consequences. Healthy categories are self-soothing, relaxation/distraction, social support and professional support. Unhealthy coping categories are negative self-talk, harmful activities (e.g., emotional eating, verbal or physical aggression, drugs such as alcohol, self-harm), social withdrawal, and suicidality. Unhealthy coping strategies are used when healthy coping strategies are overwhelmed, not in the absence of healthy coping strategies. 

Research has shown that everyone has personal healthy coping strategies (self-soothing, relaxation/distraction), however, access to social and professional support varies. Increasing distress and inadequate support results in the additional use of unhealthy coping strategies. Overwhelming distress exceeds the capacity of healthy coping strategies and results in the use of unhealthy coping strategies. Overwhelming distress is caused by problems in one or more biopsychosocial domains of health and wellbeing. The continuum of coping strategies (healthy to unhealthy, independent to social, and low harm to high harm) have been explored in general populations, university students, and paramedics.

Reactive and proactive coping
Most coping is reactive in that the coping response follows stressors. Anticipating and reacting to a future stressor is known as proactive coping or future-oriented coping. Anticipation is when one reduces the stress of some difficult challenge by anticipating what it will be like and preparing for how one is going to cope with it.

Social coping 
Social coping recognises that individuals are bedded within a social environment, which can be stressful, but also is the source of coping resources, such as seeking social support from others. (see help-seeking)

Humor 
Humor used as a positive coping method may have useful benefits to emotional and mental health well-being. However, maladaptive humor styles such as self-defeating humor can also have negative effects on psychological adjustment and might exacerbate negative effects of other stressors. 
By having a humorous outlook on life, stressful experiences can be and are often minimized. This coping method corresponds with positive emotional states and is known to be an indicator of mental health. Physiological processes are also influenced within the exercise of humor. For example, laughing may reduce muscle tension, increase the flow of oxygen to the blood, exercise the cardiovascular region, and produce endorphins in the body. Using humor in coping while processing through feelings can vary depending on life circumstance and individual humor styles. In regards to grief and loss in life occurrences, it has been found that genuine laughs/smiles when speaking about the loss predicted later adjustment and evoked more positive responses from other people. A person might also find comedic relief with others around irrational possible outcomes for the deceased funeral service. It is also possible that humor would be used by people to feel a sense of control over a more powerless situation and used as way to temporarily escape a feeling of helplessness. Exercised humor can be a sign of positive adjustment as well as drawing support and interaction from others around the loss.

Negative techniques (maladaptive coping or non-coping)

Whereas adaptive coping strategies improve functioning, a maladaptive coping technique (also termed non-coping) will just reduce symptoms while maintaining or strengthening the stressor. Maladaptive techniques are only effective as a short-term rather than long-term coping process.

Examples of maladaptive behavior strategies include anxious avoidance, dissociation, escape (including self-medication), use of maladaptive humor styles such as self-defeating humor, procrastination, rationalisation safety behaviors, and sensitization. These coping strategies interfere with the person's ability to unlearn, or break apart, the paired association between the situation and the associated anxiety symptoms. These are maladaptive strategies as they serve to maintain the disorder.

 Anxious avoidance is when a person avoids anxiety provoking situations by all means. This is the most common method.

 Dissociation is the ability of the mind to separate and compartmentalize thoughts, memories, and emotions. This is often associated with post traumatic stress syndrome.

 Escape is closely related to avoidance. This technique is often demonstrated by people who experience panic attacks or have phobias. These people want to flee the situation at the first sign of anxiety.

 The use of self-defeating humour means that a person disparages themselves in order to entertain others. This type of humour has been shown to lead to negative psychological adjustment and exacerbate the effect of existing stressors.

 Procrastination is when a person willingly delays a task in order to receive a temporary relief from stress. While this may work for short-term relief, when used as a coping mechanism, procrastination causes more issues in the long run.

 Rationalisation is the practice of attempting to use reasoning to minimise the severity of an incident, or avoid approaching it in ways that could cause psychological trauma or stress. It most commonly manifests in the form of making excuses for the behaviour of the person engaging in the rationalisation, or others involved in the situation the person is attempting to rationalise.

 Sensitization is when a person seeks to learn about, rehearse, and/or anticipate fearful events in a protective effort to prevent these events from occurring in the first place.

 Safety behaviors are demonstrated when individuals with anxiety disorders come to rely on something, or someone, as a means of coping with their excessive anxiety.

Further examples
Further examples of coping strategies include emotional or instrumental support, self-distraction, denial, substance use, self-blame, behavioral disengagement and the use of drugs or alcohol.

Many people think that meditation "not only calms our emotions, but...makes us feel more 'together, as too can "the kind of prayer in which you're trying to achieve an inner quietness and peace".

Low-effort syndrome or low-effort coping refers to the coping responses of a person refusing to work hard. For example, a student at school may learn to put in only minimal effort as they believe if they put in effort it could unveil their flaws.

Historical psychoanalytic theories

Otto Fenichel

Otto Fenichel summarized early psychoanalytic studies of coping mechanisms in children as "a gradual substitution of actions for mere discharge reactions...[&] the development of the function of judgement" – noting however that "behind all active types of mastery of external and internal tasks, a readiness remains to fall back on passive-receptive types of mastery."

In adult cases of "acute and more or less 'traumatic' upsetting events in the life of normal persons", Fenichel stressed that in coping, "in carrying out a 'work of learning' or 'work of adjustment', [s]he must acknowledge the new and less comfortable reality and fight tendencies towards regression, towards the misinterpretation of reality", though such rational strategies "may be mixed with relative allowances for rest and for small regressions and compensatory wish fulfillment, which are recuperative in effect".

Karen Horney

In the 1940s, the German Freudian psychoanalyst Karen Horney "developed her mature theory in which individuals cope with the anxiety produced by feeling unsafe, unloved, and undervalued by disowning their spontaneous feelings and developing elaborate strategies of defence." Horney defined four so-called coping strategies to define interpersonal relations, one describing psychologically healthy individuals, the others describing neurotic states.

The healthy strategy she termed "Moving with" is that with which psychologically healthy people develop relationships. It involves compromise. In order to move with, there must be communication, agreement, disagreement, compromise, and decisions. The three other strategies she described – "Moving toward", "Moving against" and "Moving away" – represented neurotic, unhealthy strategies people utilize in order to protect themselves.

Horney investigated these patterns of neurotic needs (compulsive attachments). The neurotics might feel these attachments more strongly because of difficulties within their lives. If the neurotic does not experience these needs, they will experience anxiety. The ten needs are:

 Affection and approval, the need to please others and be liked.
 A partner who will take over one's life, based on the idea that love will solve all of one's problems.
 Restriction of one's life to narrow borders, to be undemanding, satisfied with little, inconspicuous; to simplify one's life.
 Power, for control over others, for a facade of omnipotence, caused by a desperate desire for strength and dominance.
 Exploitation of others; to get the better of them.
 Social recognition or prestige, caused by an abnormal concern for appearances and popularity.
 Personal admiration.
 Personal achievement.
 Self-sufficiency and independence.
 Perfection and unassailability, a desire to be perfect and a fear of being flawed.

In Compliance, also known as "Moving toward" or the "Self-effacing solution", the individual moves towards those perceived as a threat to avoid retribution and getting hurt, "making any sacrifice, no matter how detrimental." The argument is, "If I give in, I won't get hurt." This means that: if I give everyone I see as a potential threat whatever they want, I will not be injured (physically or emotionally). This strategy includes neurotic needs one, two, and three.

In Withdrawal, also known as "Moving away" or the "Resigning solution", individuals distance themselves from anyone perceived as a threat to avoid getting hurt – "the 'mouse-hole' attitude ... the security of unobtrusiveness." The argument is, "If I do not let anyone close to me, I won't get hurt." A neurotic, according to Horney desires to be distant because of being abused. If they can be the extreme introvert, no one will ever develop a relationship with them. If there is no one around, nobody can hurt them. These "moving away" people fight personality, so they often come across as cold or shallow. This is their strategy. They emotionally remove themselves from society. Included in this strategy are neurotic needs three, nine, and ten.

In Aggression, also known as the "Moving against" or the "Expansive solution", the individual threatens those perceived as a threat to avoid getting hurt. Children might react to parental in-differences by displaying anger or hostility. This strategy includes neurotic needs four, five, six, seven, and eight.

Related to the work of Karen Horney, public administration scholars developed a classification of coping by frontline workers when working with clients (see also the work of Michael Lipsky on street-level bureaucracy). This coping classification is focused on the behavior workers can display towards clients when confronted with stress. They show that during public service delivery there are three main families of coping:

 Moving towards clients: Coping by helping clients in stressful situations. An example is a teacher working overtime to help students.
 Moving away from clients: Coping by avoiding meaningful interactions with clients in stressful situations. An example is a public servant stating "the office is very busy today, please return tomorrow." 
 Moving against clients: Coping by confronting clients. For instance, teachers can cope with stress when working with students by imposing very rigid rules, such as no cellphone use in class and sending everyone to the office when they use a cellphone. Furthermore, aggression towards clients is also included here.

In their systematic review of 35 years of the literature, the scholars found that the most often used family is moving towards clients (43% of all coping fragments). Moving away from clients was found in 38% of all coping fragments and Moving against clients in 19%.

Heinz Hartmann
 
In 1937, the psychoanalyst (as well as a physician, psychologist, and psychiatrist) Heinz Hartmann marked it as the evolution of ego psychology by publishing his paper, "Me" (which was later translated into English in 1958, titled, "The Ego and the Problem of Adaptation"). Hartmann focused on the adaptive progression of the ego "through the mastery of new demands and tasks". In fact, according to his adaptive point of view, once infants were born they have the ability to be able to cope with the demands of their surroundings. In his wake, ego psychology further stressed "the development of the personality and of 'ego-strengths'...adaptation to social realities".

Object relations
Emotional intelligence has stressed the importance of "the capacity to soothe oneself, to shake off rampant anxiety, gloom, or irritability....People who are poor in this ability are constantly battling feelings of distress, while those who excel in it can bounce back far more quickly from life's setbacks and upsets". From this perspective, "the art of soothing ourselves is a fundamental life skill; some psychoanalytic thinkers, such as John Bowlby and D. W. Winnicott see this as the most essential of all psychic tools."

Object relations theory has examined the childhood development both of "[i]ndependent coping...capacity for self-soothing", and of "[a]ided coping. Emotion-focused coping in infancy is often accomplished through the assistance of an adult."

Gender differences
Gender differences in coping strategies are the ways in which men and women differ in managing psychological stress. There is evidence that males often develop stress due to their careers, whereas females often encounter stress due to issues in interpersonal relationships. Early studies indicated that "there were gender differences in the sources of stressors, but gender differences in coping were relatively small after controlling for the source of stressors"; and more recent work has similarly revealed "small differences between women's and men's coping strategies when studying individuals in similar situations."

In general, such differences as exist indicate that women tend to employ emotion-focused coping and the "tend-and-befriend" response to stress, whereas men tend to use problem-focused coping and the "fight-or-flight" response, perhaps because societal standards encourage men to be more individualistic, while women are often expected to be interpersonal. An alternative explanation for the aforementioned differences involves genetic factors. The degree to which genetic factors and social conditioning influence behavior, is the subject of ongoing debate.

Physiological basis
Hormones also play a part in stress management. Cortisol, a stress hormone, was found to be elevated in males during stressful situations. In females, however, cortisol levels were decreased in stressful situations, and instead, an increase in limbic activity was discovered. Many researchers believe that these results underlie the reasons why men administer a fight-or-flight reaction to stress; whereas, females have a tend-and-befriend reaction. The "fight-or-flight" response activates the sympathetic nervous system in the form of increased focus levels, adrenaline, and epinephrine. Conversely, the "tend-and-befriend" reaction refers to the tendency of women to protect their offspring and relatives. Although these two reactions support a genetic basis to differences in behavior, one should not assume that in general females cannot implement "fight-or-flight" behavior or that males cannot implement "tend-and-befriend" behavior. Additionally, this study implied differing health impacts for each gender as a result of the contrasting stress-processes.

See also

References

Sources

Further reading
Susan Folkman and Richard S. Lazarus, "Coping and Emotion", in Nancy Stein et al. eds., Psychological and Biological Approaches to Emotion (1990)

External links

Coping Skills for Trauma
Coping Strategies for Children and Teenagers Living with Domestic Violence

Interpersonal conflict
Personal life
Psychological stress
Human behavior
Life skills